Mary Jo Randle (born 26 April 1954) is an English actress from Rochdale, Lancashire) working in theatre and television.

After a childhood in Littleborough, Randle left home to study for a degree in drama at the University of Birmingham but switched course to Social Administration. Upon graduation she applied and was accepted for a place at RADA, where she was the recipient of the Bancroft Gold Medal. In 1981 she won Most Promising Actress at the Ronson awards.

Mary Jo Randle is best known for her roles as Jo Morgan in The Bill (1993–1995) and Bernie Quinlan in The Lakes. She has also featured in Holby City, Emmerdale, Victoria Wood as Seen on TV, The Royal, Casualty, Doctors, Heartbeat, Inspector Morse, Dalziel and Pascoe, Bad Behaviour, Wire in the Blood and a public information film on smoke alarms.

Selected filmography

Film

Television

References

External links

English television actresses
English soap opera actresses
1954 births
Living people
Actors from Rochdale
Actors from Lancashire